Georgi Dimitrov (2 May 1904 – 12 March 1979) was a Bulgarian composer. He was notable for composing the music for the national anthem of Bulgaria from 1947 until 1951, Republiko nasha, zdravey!. Other notable compositions including Foot and Cross, Kulak, and The Chervenkov Way.

Early life 
Dimitrov was born to a Bulgarian family of Angelina and Dimitar Petrovi in Belogradchik, Bulgaria. His name was taken from the Gergyovden day (Saint George's Day), that occurred in the eve of his birth.

He spent his youth and teenage years in Belogradchik and Lom, where he studied at the famous Lom Pedagogical School. His initial interest for music came from his family; his father was a violinist and his mother was an excellent singer. This attracted him greatly to music and he started to learn to play the violin. Further development of his musical potential was carried out under the care and guidance of music teachers Belcho Belchev and especially Obreten Evstatiev.

Young Georgi's life was stormy and full of rumors. This is the life of an educated and sensitive young man who opposes public order irregularities and strives for a better life for people. This is not a "rallying rebellion" or "spontaneous" demonstration of "early-stage students", but an active and conscious struggle. His failure in it made him emigrate at 19 years old, and for many years he "has been wandering away from a foreign country". For some time he lived in Romania, then in Yugoslavia and finally - about 15 years in Poland, which became his second homeland. There he got his musical education and in direct contact with the culture of the Central European countries, he created a worldview, a culture and a strategy for his further personal and professional realization.

In the fall of 1927, Georgi Dimitrov became a student at the Warsaw Conservatory. His lecturers were the prominent Polish musicians Stanisław Kazuro, Kasimir Sikorsky, Grzegorz Fitelberg, Stanisław Viekhovich, and others, from whom he received a solid professional musical-theoretical training choral and symphonic conduction, harmony, polyphony, composition, voice production, violin. Of great importance for his prosperity is his communication with the then-head of the Polish music, Karol Szymanowski (1883-1970).

Georgi Dimitrov married the artist Lyuba Palikarova. This puts him in a new dilemma for family support, and therefore, alongside his studies at the conservatory, he started working as a high school music teacher in the town of Grueth. Thanks to the accumulated pedagogical experience, in 1931 he moved to Warsaw and became a teacher in one of the most famous high schools at the time- Stanislav Lorenz.
1934 occupies an important place in the life of the young musician because he graduates with honors the Conservatory; on the recommendation of Karol Shimanovski, the most famous Polish publishing house, Gebetner and Wolf, prints a scroll with "Three Bulgarian Folk Songs" ("Seyla is a Little Girl", "Ummrell Djerman" and "I Move, I Want"); he became a conductor of the Bulgarian Student Society "Hristo Botev" and a head of the chorus at the Polish boarding schools for young people without parents.

Led by his desire to gain more knowledge, the graduate teacher, conductor and composer began studying musicology at the Warsaw University. And the position of Chief Leader of Polish Youth Choirs gives him the exceptionally good opportunity to travel around the country and to discover and realize his managerial qualities that he has not suspected so far.

Career 
In 1938, Georgi Dimitrov returned to Bulgaria, filled with ideas and business plans. The qualities of the 35-year-old musician do not go unnoticed and gradually he starts to "climb" on the steep music and public ladder. In this process an important role played the impressive success achieved by the man-made chamber choir - which mainly promotes the work of the Bulgarian composers, who regularly concerts "live" in Radio Sofia. His work as a music inspector at the Ministry of National Education and the Artistic Secretary of the Sofia Opera have confirmed him as a prospective conductor, composer and public figure with a high state feeling.

His rich personal, creative and managerial potential, Georgi Dimitrov, unfolds completely in the years after the end of the Second World War, when he headed the new state structure "Directorate for Music, Creativity and Performing Arts". It can be said that it is becoming a true "Ministry of Music", through which the state policy on the culture in the country was implemented. Under Georgi Dimitrov's leadership, an incredibly active and fruitful activity has developed. For this purpose, on his initiative, a large-scale prospective plan is being developed, carried out gradually in the coming years. I can not fail to mention his main accents: 
- the creation of new state symphony orchestras - and, in this case, operas in Plovdiv, Varna, Rousse, Pleven, Bourgas, Shumen, Vidin, Vratsa;
- the introduction of "government procurement" practices into culture as an important stimulus for the creation of new musical works; 
- the regulation of Bulgarian music as the main indicator in the repertoire of all music institutes in the country; 
- to intensify the concert life in the country by increasing the percentage of the world's most prominent artists; 
- turning the export of Bulgarian musicians to acting abroad as an element of state policy; 
- the establishment of various types of national competitions for instrumentalists and singers, and the reviews of state symphony orchestras and operas;
- the creation of the State Folk Song and Dance Ensemble "Philip Kutev" and defining its role as an example of the rapid development of folklore art in the country; 
- developing a concept of the important role of non-professional (amateur) art as a natural reserve and an integral part of the public phenomenon of musical art; 
- systemic state support for young musicians and ballet dancers by participating in international competitions and raising their professional qualifications in the most renowned schools in Europe.

In this series a special place is occupied by Professor Georgi Dimitrov in 1951, choir-conductor specialty at the State Music Academy. For the needs of the choir-conducting education, the professor creates several teaching aids, among which the "Choral arts talks", the multi-volume "choir chorus" (in co-authorship) and others. Parallel to this, starting in 1949, for more than 15 years he has held "summer courses" for the improvement of the professional qualification of the choral conductors and especially of the teachers-choral conductors.

The Choir-conducting School of Prof. Georgi Dimitrov and his chore-conducting cadres are an important part of his "Golden Deposit" not only in the Bulgarian, but also in the world cultural treasury. He created a host of conductors-conductors, conductors-phenomena such as (in alphabetical order) Prof. Vassil Arnaudov, Prof. Veneta Vicheva, Varban Rangelov, Prof. Georgi Robev, Prof. Kiril Stefanov, Prof. Lilia Gyuleva, Lubomir Karoleev, Marin Tzonev, Acad. Hristo Nedyalkov, Acad. Valentin Bobevski, etc., whose art is recognized everywhere in the world. And one more thing - with an inner conviction, he won the "battle" to overcome the former discrimination of women regarding their participation in the "male" conducting profession. I would like to emphasize that for us - his students, he was not only a teacher but also a caring father,
Another important part of the contribution of Prof. Georgi Dimitrov in our national culture is his choral work. It is unclear how, in his incredibly large public engagement, he found strength and inspiration for the creation of choral songs. Unlike his most famous songs written in Poland ("Ummrell Djerman", "I Move, I Move", "Seyla e"), Bulgarians are characterized by their vitality, patriotism, optimism, ingenuity and captivating humor ("Flowering Lichko-lyric "," Dülger's Sword "," Evening Twilight "," Siniger's Wedding "," Spring of Me, "" Sword of the Lilac ", etc.). the first Bulgarian a cappella cantata "Kratka na Rodina", for children, girls,
I have tried to calculate how many hours is the working day of Prof. Georgi Dimitrov. By rough calculations it's about 20 hours! In the morning, he was getting up early and going to the directorate, then to lectures and every night - he was necessarily present at a concert in Bulgaria Hall, where he had a "reserved" place on the first row before the first lodge or a show to be accurately informed. There was a visit to the Club of the Union of Bulgarian Composers and at midnight hours ... composing! He had iron health and easily endured the enormous daily stress. He was a man with a strong sense of humor, which he used "sparingly," but "right on the spot." He loved to cook and I admit that I tasted more gullish than his one in Hungary! He was not speechless, but all his speeches were precise and constructive.

Since Prof. Georgi Dimitrov was a man with a well-respected personal dignity and an excellent manager, everyone was in touch with his expert assessments. It also helped him to oppose the supreme institutions, which often cost him the experience of negative emotions. With regular people, familiar and strange, he always communicated as an equal, without a drop of pride. He managed to welcome guests and create a fresh atmosphere.

The more the time progresses, the more he confirms the significance of the work of the artist, teacher and statesman Prof. Georgi Dimitrov. Despite the serious illness that has diminished his public activity during the last 15 years of his life, he never ceased to be interested in his problems and to give his wise advice about the development of Bulgarian musical art.

References

Bulgarian composers
1904 births
1979 deaths